Paul Scott "Ricky" Jordan (born May 26, 1965) is a former first baseman in Major League Baseball (MLB) who played from  to  for the Philadelphia Phillies and Seattle Mariners. He was noted for being a very good pinch hitter.

Early life
Jordan was born in Richmond, California. He was adopted when he was a few days old. Jordan's adoptive father died when he was five, and one of his youth sports coaches became very influential in his upbringing. He attended Grant Union High School in Sacramento, California. He was selected in the first round (22nd overall) on the June 1983 amateur baseball draft by the Philadelphia Phillies.

Baseball career
Jordan's first MLB game was on July 17, 1988. During his first at-bat that game, he hit a home run.

In 677 games over eight seasons, Jordan posted a .281 batting average (592-for-2104) with 261 runs, 116 doubles, 55 home runs, 304 RBI, 77 bases on balls and a .424 slugging percentage. He finished his career with a .993 fielding percentage playing 510 games at first base and 11 games at left field. In 5 postseasons games, he hit .182 (2-for-11) with no runs or RBI.

References

External links

1965 births
American adoptees
Living people
Philadelphia Phillies players
Seattle Mariners players
African-American baseball players
Major League Baseball first basemen
Baseball players from California
Helena Phillies players
Spartanburg Suns players
Clearwater Phillies players
Reading Phillies players
Maine Phillies players
Scranton/Wilkes-Barre Red Barons players
Everett AquaSox players
Lancaster JetHawks players
Tacoma Rainiers players
Carolina Mudcats players
Sportspeople from Richmond, California
21st-century African-American people
20th-century African-American sportspeople